Green Mountain Valley School is a college preparatory high school located near Sugarbush Resort in Waitsfield, Vermont. The school was founded in 1973 by Al Hobart, Bill Moore, John Schultz, Ashley Cadwell and Jane Hobart.

Overview
Green Mountain Valley School trains athletes focused on alpine skiing, Nordic skiing and biathlon. The school serves about 130 students in grades 7–12. (The seventh-grade program, called "G7," goes from November to April only, with students expected to attend their home schools in the off-season).

Alpine skiers train on the ski run Kelly Brush Race Arena, located at Sugarbush Resort, Mount Ellen. Nordic skiers and biathletes train at multiple Nordic training facilities throughout the area. Many students go on to race for D-I colleges with top tier NCAA ski teams.

Notable alumni 

 Doug Lewis - 2-time Olympian (1984, 1988)
 Daron Rahlves - 4-time Olympian (1998, 2002, 2006, 2010)
 AJ Kitt - 4-time Olympian (1988, 1992, 1994, 1998)

 Jeremy Transue - U.S. Ski Team Alumni 2002-2009
 Genevieve Simard - 2-time Olympian (2002, 2006)
 Chelsea Marshall - Olympian (2010)
 Laura Spector - Olympian (2010)
 Sarah Billmeier - Paralympian (1992, 1994, 1998, 2002)

References

External links
 

Buildings and structures in Waitsfield, Vermont
Boarding schools in Vermont
Private high schools in Vermont